Photographer is a 2006 Indian Malayalam-language drama film written and directed by Ranjan Pramod. Starring Mohanlal,  Neethu, Master Mani and Biju Menon in lead roles. The film is loosely based on the Muthanga incident of 2003, in which a policeman and a tribal were killed. Mohanlal plays dual roles as a wildlife photographer and a farmer. The soundtrack was composed by Johnson.

The film marks the directorial debut of screenwriter Pramod and the debut of Kannada actress Neethu in Malayalam cinema, as well as the comeback of composer Johnson after a sabbatical. Photographer was released on 21 October 2006 on the occasion of Diwali. Mani, who played the role of a tribal boy won the Kerala State Film Award for Best Child Artist. Johnson won the Mathrubhumi Film Award for Best Music Director for the soundtrack and Mullasserry Raju Music Award for the song "Enthe Kannanu".

Plot

Dijo John is a nature and wildlife photographer. He has a wife and a young son. In a flashback scene, we see Dijo eloping with Brahmin girl Sathyavathy.

He keeps taking trips to the forests and taking pictures for magazines like National Geographic and also on his website which he uses to sell his images online. On one such trip to the forests, he happens to save an adivasi boy, Thammi, from the hands of a notorious police officer and his crew and becomes the spokesperson on their behalf.

He even makes a photograph of the police officer aiming at the harmless boy and tries to bring the issue to the public. But his friend who is also the state forest minister assures protection to the boy and advises him from making these incidents more public. Thammi who is lodged in a juvenile home, happens to be there for a while but toward the middle of the film goes missing. Then our wild life activist is again on the run towards the interiors of the forest to trace the child. And amidst the new mission, the photographer is also missing.

Dijo's younger brother Joy is a happy-go-lucky rich planter and a pulp writer who has a publication. He try to investigate the situation but with little success. Later, Dijo is found walking around the forest in a dazed condition as he realizes that his fight for the rights of adivasi is a futile exercise and all including his friend, the forest minister and the bureaucracy is nowhere to help the men of the forest.

Cast
 Mohanlal as Photographer Dijo John / Planter Joy John (double role)
 Bharathi Vishnuvardhan as Dijo's mother
 Neethu as Sathyavathi, Dijo's wife 
 Master Mani as Thammi a tribal child
 Biju Menon as Forest Minister
 Master Sougandh as Sharan
 Saranya Bhagyaraj as Asha
 Venu Nagavalli as Chief Minister
 Manoj K. Jayan as Circle Inspector
 Ramachandran as Jose John (Dijo's /Joy's Elder Brother)
 Mammukoya as Teastall owner Hassanikka
 K. B. Ganesh Kumar as Ananthan
 Murali as Viplavam Balan
 Ambika Mohan as Balan's wife
 Daniel Balaji as S.I.T officer
 Janaki Sabesh as John's sister-in-law

Production
The film is loosely based on the Muthanga incident of 2003, in which a policeman and a tribal were killed. The film marks the directorial debut of screenwriter Ranjan Pramod. Filming began in July 2006. The film was also the debut of Kannada actress Neethu in Malayalam cinema, as well as the comeback of composer Johnson after a sabbatical. Mani, a real tribal boy played a tribal in the film.

Soundtrack
The original songs featured in the film was composed by Johnson, with lyrics by Kaithapram Damodaran. Soundtrack album was released by the label Satyam Audios.

Release
Photographer was released in theatres on 24 October 2006.

Awards
Master Mani won the Kerala State Film Award for Best Child Artist. Johnson won the Mathrubhumi Film Award for Best Music Director for the soundtrack and the Mullasserry Raju Music Award for the song "Enthe Kannanu".

References

External links
 

2006 films
2006 drama films
2000s Malayalam-language films
Films scored by Johnson
2006 directorial debut films